was a Japanese poet for the Proletarian literature movement and was noted for writing children's stories, comic books and literary criticism. A Hideo Oguma poetry prize is awarded for new poetry writers.

Selected paintings

Selected drawings

References

1901 births
1940 deaths
20th-century Japanese poets
Japanese women poets